Glass Vaults is a New Zealand indie rock band formed in Wellington, New Zealand.

History

Early years
The band was founded by Richard Larsen, and Rowan Pierce in 2010 after graduating from Toi Whakaari. The band name was inspired by the vaulted ceilings of cathedrals.

Sojourn
In 2013, the band began work on their first full-length album Sojourn which was released by Flying Out in mid-2015. Sojourn included such singles as "Life is the Show" and "Ancient Gates", which received extensive airplay on alternative radio stations such as 95bFM and Radioactive.

The New Happy
Their second album The New Happy, was released in mid-2017 in New Zealand.

The band took aural cues from Autonomous Sensory Meridian Response and influences from tracks of Talking Heads, Tom Tom Club, and Grace Jones with minimal reverb and dry sounding percussion.

Discography

Studio albums

EPs

References

External links

Wellington City Library Profile
NZ Musician Glass Vaults interview

New Zealand indie rock groups